Sylva, or A Discourse of Forest-Trees and the Propagation of Timber in His Majesty's Dominions by the English writer John Evelyn was first presented in 1662 as a paper to the Royal Society. It was published as a book two years later in 1664, and is recognised as one of the most influential texts on forestry ever published.

Editions 

 1662 Sylva paper was presented to the Royal Society on 16 February 1662.
 1664 Sylva First Edition book printed by publisher John Martyn for the Royal Society, and the first book published after the granting of their Royal Charter as publishers in 1662.
 1670 Sylva Second Edition. Various engravings added.
 1679 Sylva Third Edition. Included an essay from Evelyn about soils: Terra, a Philosophical Essay of Earth, being a Lecture in Course.
 1706 Silva Fourth Edition, now spelt Silva, contained new sections Dendrologia, Pomona; Or, An Appendix concerning Fruit-Trees in relation to CIDER and Kalendarium Hortense. This was the last edition during Evelyn's lifetime.

Posthumous editions 
 1707 Silva edition.
 1729 Silva edition.

Five editions were edited by Alexander Hunter (1729-1809):
  1776 (illustrations by John Miller)
 1786
 1801
 1812
 1825

Recent reproductions 
 A facsimile of the first edition (1664) was produced in 1972 by the publisher Scolar Press.
 The fourth edition (1706) was republished in 1908 by Doubleday & Co. with a foreword by John Nisbet. This 1908 edition was republished in facsimile by Kessinger Publishing (30 Nov 2007).
 A new edition by Gabriel Hemery with illustrations by Sarah Simblet is published by Bloomsbury to coincide with the 350th anniversary in 2014 of the book's first publication. It is titled The New Sylva: a discourse of forest and orchard trees for the twenty-first century. The authors have their own blog following the book's creation: sylva.org.uk

See also

Hans Carl von Carlowitz

References

External links 
 Sylva, Fourth Edition (1706, republished 1908), vol. 1, text download from Project Gutenberg
 Sylva, Fourth Edition (1706, republished 1908), vol. 2, text download from Google Books
 Sylva, Fifth Edition (republished 1825), vol. 2, text download from Google Books
 Commons:Category:Royal Society Library, includes several photos of the 1st edition of Sylva.

1664 books
Forestry in the United Kingdom
Forest history
Science books